Gandar-e Pain (also Romanized as Gāndar-e Pā’īn) is a village in Rahdar Rural District, in the Central District of Rudan County, Hormozgan Province, Iran. At the 2006 census, its population was 209, in 37 families.

References 

Populated places in Rudan County